This is a list players from ŠK Slovan Bratislava who were award winners and top goal scorers.

Award winners

Czechoslovak Footballer of the Year
 Ján Popluhár – 1965
 Ján Pivarník – 1974

Slovak Footballer of the Year
 Peter Dubovský – 1993
 Vladimír Kinder – 1994
 Dušan Tittel – 1995, 1996, 1997
 Jozef Majoroš – 1998

Top goalscorers
 Tomáš Porubský – 1939-40 (27 goals)
 Ján Arpáš – 1940-41 (19 goals)
 Ján Arpáš – 1941-42 (19 goals)
 Ján Arpáš – 1943-44 (28 goals)
 Emil Pažický – 1955 (19 goals)
 Ján Čapkovič – 1991–92 (19 goals)
 Marián Masný – 1980–81 (16 goals)
 Peter Dubovský – 1991–92 (22 goals)
 Peter Dubovský – 1992–93 (23 goals)
 Pavol Masaryk – 2008–09 (15 goals)
 Filip Šebo – 2010–11 (22 goals)

ŠK Slovan Bratislava